Bilal Mazhar Abdelrahman Zeeni (born 21 November 2003) is a professional footballer who plays as a center forward for Super League club Panathinaikos, as well as Super League 2 club Panathinaikos B. Born in France, he has opted to represent Egypt internationally.

Career

Panathinaikos U19

Bilal was the first scorer in the Youth Super League in the 2021–22 season. On 14 September 2022, he became the fourth player to score five goals in a single match in the history of UEFA Youth League. That match ended with an 8–0 victory over PFC Slavia Sofia, during the 2022–23 season.

International career
Born in France, Bilal is of Egyptian descent. He was called up to represent the Egypt U20s for the 2023 Africa U-20 Cup of Nations.

Personal life
He is the son of former Egyptian international Mazhar Abdel Rahman.

Career Statistics

References

Living people
2003 births
People from Châteauroux
Egyptian footballers
Egypt youth international footballers
French footballers
French people of Egyptian descent
Super League Greece players
Super League Greece 2 players
Panathinaikos F.C. players
Panathinaikos F.C. B players
Egyptian expatriate sportspeople in Greece
French expatriate sportspeople in Greece
Egyptian expatriate footballers
French expatriate footballers